Matthew Richard Ryan (born April 17, 1997) is an American professional basketball player for the Minnesota Timberwolves of the National Basketball Association (NBA), on a two-way contract with the Iowa Wolves of the NBA G League. He played college basketball for Notre Dame, Vanderbilt and Chattanooga. He began his pro career in the NBA G League, before signing a two-way contract with the Boston Celtics.

High school career
Ryan attended Iona Prep where he led the Gaels to a 22–6 record en route to the program’s first Class AA Archdiocesan Championship while averaging 20.0 points, 8.0 rebounds and 5.0 assists per game as a senior while also being named Mr. New York Basketball.  He was also named a first-team Parade All-American.

College career
Ryan began his college career at Notre Dame, where he played sparingly before transferring to Vanderbilt after his sophomore season. As a junior, he averaged 8.1 points and 2.7 rebounds per game. Following the season, Ryan transferred to Chattanooga. As a senior, he had his best season, playing 33 games and averaging 15.4 points, 4.9 rebounds, and 1.9 assists in 30.6 minutes per game, while shooting 42.3 percent from the field, 35.9 percent from three-point range and 87.9 percent from the free-throw line.

Professional career
Ryan went undrafted in the 2020 NBA draft. His prospects were limited by the COVID-19 pandemic, and he did not land a spot in the G League's bubble in 2020–21. He resorted to working for DoorDash and UberEats while coaching a grassroots basketball team. He also worked at a cemetery in Yonkers, New York.

Grand Rapids Gold (2021–2022)
Ryan joined the Cleveland Cavaliers for the 2021 NBA Summer League and spent preseason with the Denver Nuggets. He subsequently joined the Grand Rapids Gold of the G League for the 2021–22 season. He averaged 15.8 points in 28 games for the Gold.

Boston Celtics (2022)
On February 28, 2022, Ryan signed a two-way contract with the Boston Celtics. He averaged 20.4 points in 14 games for the Maine Red Claws to finish the 2021–22 NBA G League season. He made his first and only appearance for the Celtics on April 10, 2022, against the Memphis Grizzlies, scoring three points in five minutes. The Celtics made it to the 2022 NBA Finals, where they lost to the Golden State Warriors in six games.

Ryan joined the Celtics for the 2022 NBA Summer League.

Los Angeles Lakers (2022) 
On September 26, 2022, Ryan signed with the Los Angeles Lakers. He made 37.5% of his 3-pointers in the preseason and earned the final spot on the team's 15-man roster out of training camp. On November 2, he hit a corner 3-pointer to tie the game at the regulation buzzer against the New Orleans Pelicans, with the Lakers going on to win 120–117 in overtime. He had missed six of his first seven 3-point attempts against the Pelicans and finished the game with 11 points. Ryan was waived by the Lakers on December 1.

Minnesota Timberwolves (2022–present)
On December 8, 2022, Ryan signed a two-way contract with the Minnesota Timberwolves.

Career statistics

NBA

|-
| style="text-align:left;"| 
| style="text-align:left;"| Boston
| 1 || 0 || 5.0 || .200 || .200 || — || .0 || .0 || 1.0 || .0 || 3.0
|-
| style="text-align:left;"| 
| style="text-align:left;"| L.A. Lakers
| 12 || 0 || 10.8 || .306 || .371 || .800 || 1.2 || .3 || .2 || .0 || 3.9
|- class="sortbottom"
| style="text-align:center;" colspan="2"|Career
| 13 || 0 || 10.3 || .296 || .350 || .800 || 1.1 || .3 || .2 || .0 || 3.8

Personal life
He is the son of Richard and Laurie Ryan and has two siblings, Mikela and Michael. He earned a bachelor’s degree in Economics at Vanderbilt and worked on his MBA at Chattanooga.

References

External links

Chattanooga Mocs bio
Vanderbilt Commodores bio
Notre Dame Fighting Irish bio
RealGM.com profile

1997 births
Living people
American men's basketball players
Basketball players from New York (state)
Boston Celtics players
Chattanooga Mocs men's basketball players
Grand Rapids Gold players
Los Angeles Lakers players
Notre Dame Fighting Irish men's basketball players
People from White Plains, New York
Small forwards
Sportspeople from Westchester County, New York
Undrafted National Basketball Association players
United States men's national basketball team players
Vanderbilt Commodores men's basketball players